Thomas Fulton Crosby Jr. (June 4, 1940 – January 23, 2004) was an American judge. He acted as Associate Justice of the California Fourth District Court of Appeal, Division Three, having been appointed to the post by Jerry Brown as Governor in 1982.

Born in Long Beach, California, Crosby graduated from Wilson High School before receiving an A.B. from Stanford University in 1962, an LL.B. from UC Berkeley School of Law in 1965, and an LL.M. from the University of Virginia School of Law in 1988.

Crosby worked for the National Labor Relations Board from 1965 to 1967, the Peace Corps in Peru from 1967 to 1969, and the Orange County District Attorney office from 1969 to 1973.  From 1973 to 1981, he worked in his own law firm.

Governor Jerry Brown appointed Crosby to the Orange County Superior Court in 1981.  Thirteen months later, Brown moved Crosby to the newly created Division Three of the Fourth District Court of Appeal in December 1982.

As a graduate student at Berkeley, Crosby met his first wife, undergraduate Sharon Scott, with whom he had two sons: Scott (born during the 1970 Super Bowl) and Brett (born 1974).  While a justice of the Court of Appeal, he married his second wife, Patty.

References

External links
Thomas F. Crosby, Jr. - Official memorial web site

1940 births
2004 deaths
People from Long Beach, California
People from Tustin, California
Stanford University alumni
UC Berkeley School of Law alumni
University of Virginia School of Law alumni
Judges of the California Courts of Appeal
20th-century American judges
American expatriates in Peru